Cle Elum Lake is a lake and reservoir along the course of the Cle Elum River, in Washington state USA. At the site of the future city of Cle Elum, Washington, a Northern Pacific Railway station was named Clealum after the Kittitas name Tle-el-Lum (tlielləm), meaning "swift water", referring to the Cle Elum River. The lake was also labeled as Kleattam Lake in maps of the 1850s.

Location
Cle Elum Lake is the easternmost lake of three large lakes (two are north and one is south of Interstate 90) in the Cascade Range.  The middle one, Kachess Lake is also north of I-90 while the westernmost, Keechelus Lake is south of I-90.

Cle Elum Lake is part of the Columbia River basin, as the Cle Elum River is a tributary of the Yakima River, which is a tributary to the Columbia River.

Usage
The lake is used as a storage reservoir for the Yakima Project, an irrigation project run by the United States Bureau of Reclamation. Although a natural lake, Cle Elum Lake's capacity and discharge is controlled by Cle Elum Dam, a 165-foot (50 m) high earthfill structure built in 1933. As a storage reservoir, Cle Elum Lake's active capacity is 436,900  acre feet (539,000,000 m³).

In Pop Culture

 In 1994, the fictional village of Monanash was filmed on Cle Elum Lake for the TV show Northern Exposure.

References

External links
 Cle Elum Dam, United States Bureau of Reclamation
 Cle Elum Lake The Columbia Gazetteer of North America. 2000.
 

Reservoirs in Washington (state)
Lakes of Kittitas County, Washington
Buildings and structures in Kittitas County, Washington
Protected areas of Kittitas County, Washington
Wenatchee National Forest
Dams in Washington (state)
United States Bureau of Reclamation dams
Dams completed in 1933